In category theory, a branch of mathematics, profunctors are a generalization of relations and also of bimodules.

Definition 

A profunctor (also named distributor by the French school and module by the Sydney school)  from a category  to a category , written

,

is defined to be a functor

Profunctors as categories 

(These are also known as het-sets, since the corresponding morphisms can be called heteromorphisms.)

A functor is a special case of a profunctor in the same way that a function is a special case of a relation.

Composition of profunctors 

The composite  of two profunctors

 and 

is given by

It can be shown that

where  is the least equivalence relation such that  whenever there exists a morphism  in  such that

Equivalently, profunctor composition can be written using a coend

The bicategory of profunctors 

Composition of profunctors is associative only up to isomorphism (because the product is not strictly associative in Set). The best one can hope is therefore to build a bicategory Prof whose
 0-cells are small categories,
 1-cells between two small categories are the profunctors between those categories,
 2-cells between two profunctors are the natural transformations between those profunctors.

Properties

Lifting functors to profunctors 
A functor  can be seen as a profunctor  by postcomposing with the Yoneda functor:

.

It can be shown that such a profunctor  has a right adjoint.

References 

 
 

Functors